Hello Daddy is a 1996 Indian Kannada-language fantasy comedy film directed by Naganna and produced by Raju. The film stars Vishnuvardhan, Sonakshi and Surabhi. The film was widely popular for the songs composed by Hamsalekha upon release.

The movie was a below average grosser.

Plot 
Prakash, a widower, is a government official responsible for confiscating lands acquired by criminals illegally. His son wants him to get a life and tries to find a suitor. The criminals wants to take revenge on Prakash for ruining their plan for that they employ an evil sorcerer to cast a spell on him. The sorcerer ends up interchanging the souls of Prakash and his son resulting in Prakash behaving like his son and vice versa.

Cast 
 Vishnuvardhan as Prakash
 Sonakshi as Prakash's deceased wife
 Surabhi as Surabhi
 Vaishali Kasaravalli as Surabhi's grandmother
 Vimala
 Sudheer
 Lohithaswa
 Master Nithin as Arun
 Sanjana
 Mandeep Roy
 Biradar
 Arjun as Jijo

Soundtrack 
The music of the film was composed and lyrics written by Hamsalekha. The audio was released by Anand Audio company.

References

External links 
 

1990s fantasy comedy films
1990s Kannada-language films
1996 comedy films
1996 films
Films directed by Naganna
Films scored by Hamsalekha
Indian fantasy comedy films